is the third season of the animated television series Bakugan: Battle Planet. It was formally announced in November 2020 and consists of 52 eleven-minute episodes (26 twenty two-minute episodes).

The season debuted in Canada on Teletoon on January 24, 2021 and was later rebroadcast on YTV starting March 5, 2021. On March 12, 2021, the Japanese version debuted bi-weekly on April 2, 2021. Netflix streamed the first half of Bakugan: Geogan Rising on April 15, 2021. The second half was released on Roblox on September 8, 2021 and on Netflix on September 15, 2021.


Episode list

Notes

References

Bakugan episode lists
2021 Canadian television seasons
2021 Japanese television seasons
2022 Japanese television seasons